The Cary Library is the public library of Houlton, Maine, USA.  It is located at 107 Main Street, in an architecturally distinguished building designed by John Calvin Stevens. The building was added to the National Register of Historic Places in 1987.  The library opened on October 12, 1904.

Architecture and history
Houlton's first attempts to establish a library began in 1850 with a private collection.  After two such efforts failed, a third effort begun in 1896 succeeded.  This effort was significantly aided by a major bequest from the estate of Dr. George Cary, a local medical doctor and onetime state legislator.  This bequest was further augmented with funding from industrialist and philanthropist Andrew Carnegie, who gave $10,000 to the campaign.  Prominent Portland architect John Calvin Stevens was commissioned to the design the building, which was completed in 1904.

The building designed by Stevens bears a significant resemblance to a recently completed earlier commission, the Rumford Public Library.  It is a 1-1/2 story T-shaped structure, built out of coursed ashlar granite.  It has a steeply pitched side gable slate roof, with chimneys at each end.  The main (north-facing) facade is three bays wide, with a projecting central bay topped by a gable.  The outer bays each have a bank of three sash windows, with granite sills and lintels.  The projecting center section shelters the main entrance, which is recessed behind an arched opening, above which is a stone placard naming the building and a small sash window in the gable.  The building's cornices are detailed with dentil stonework.  A major expansion to the rear in 1968 gave the building its present T shape.  The interior was originally laid out with a central circulation desk, flanked on either side by reading rooms, with the stack area in the projecting section to the rear.  The original desk has since been removed.

See also
National Register of Historic Places listings in Aroostook County, Maine
List of Carnegie libraries in Maine

References

External links
Library web site

Library buildings completed in 1900
Public libraries in Maine
Buildings and structures in Houlton, Maine
Libraries on the National Register of Historic Places in Maine
Libraries in Aroostook County, Maine
Carnegie libraries in Maine
National Register of Historic Places in Aroostook County, Maine